Westside Mine is a former coal mine located at Wakefield, New South Wales, Australia. The open cut mine was developed to provide coal for the Eraring Power Station. The mine started in 1992 and closed in February 2012 due to exhaustion of mineable reserves. 

The mine site is being rehabilitated following most equipment being removed. The mine area has been reshaped to remove any high walls and covered with topsoil and seeded with native vegetation. During the last nine years of the mine's life, it was operated under contract by Thiess Australian Mining and was the most productive mine in the Hunter Valley region measured by production tonnes per team member. The rehabilitated mine site has second generation flora and seven threatened species of wildlife have been observed.

References

External links 

Xstrata Coal - Westside Mine

Coal mines in New South Wales
City of Lake Macquarie